Claudia Bokel (born 30 August 1973, in Ter Apel, the Netherlands) is a German épée fencer.

Biography
Claudia Bokel fought for the Fencing-Club Tauberbischofsheim. At the 2004 Summer Olympics, she won the silver medal in the épée competition with her teammates, Britta Heidemann and Imke Duplitzer. She also competed at the 1996 and 2000 Summer Olympics.

She won a gold medal at the 2001 World Fencing Championships and at the 2006 European Seniors Fencing Championship épée event. During the 2006 World Fencing Championships, she won the bronze medal after beating Romania in the épée team event together with her teammates Imke Duplitzer, Britta Heidemann and Marijana Markovic.

In August 2008, she was elected as a member of the International Olympic Committee and the IOC Athletes' Commission by the 120th IOC Session. After her 8-year term ended in 2016, she could not be proposed as an IOC Individual Member as her teammate Britta Heidemann was in the running for the next term.

References 

1973 births
Living people
German female fencers
Dutch emigrants to Germany
Fencers at the 1996 Summer Olympics
Fencers at the 2000 Summer Olympics
Fencers at the 2004 Summer Olympics
Olympic fencers of Germany
Olympic silver medalists for Germany
People from Westerwolde (municipality)
International Olympic Committee members
Olympic medalists in fencing
Medalists at the 2004 Summer Olympics
Sportspeople from Groningen (province)
21st-century German women